Harry B. Hershey (March 8, 1885 – August 3, 1967) was an American jurist.

Hershey was born March 8, 1885, in Mifflin, Ohio. His family moved to Taylorville, Illinois where Hershey was educated in Taylorville public schools. He earned his bachelor's degree from the University of Illinois and his Juris Doctor from the University of Chicago Law School. Hershey was admitted to the bar in 1911. The next year, he was elected City Attorney of Taylorville and shortly there after elected State's Attorney for Christian County. Hershey served two terms as State's Attorney from 1912 to 1920. He then served two, two-year terms as the Mayor of Taylorville from 1922 to 1926. In 1940, Hershey defeated incumbent Lieutenant Governor John Henry Stelle in the Democratic gubernatorial primary. In the general election, Republican nominee and former U.S. Attorney for Northern Illinois Dwight H. Green defeated Hershey with 52.93% of the vote to Hershey's 46.74% of the vote.

After having served as general counsel for the Bureau of Liquidation, Conservation and Rehabilitation for the Department of Insurance from 1932 to 1940, Governor Adlai Stevenson appointed Hershey the department's director in 1949. He served in this position until he joined the Illinois Supreme Court from the 2nd district. He served on the court until 1966. Hershey died in a hospital in Taylorville, Illinois.

Notes

1885 births
1967 deaths
People from Taylorville, Illinois
People from Ashland County, Ohio
University of Chicago Law School alumni
University of Illinois alumni
Illinois Democrats
Mayors of places in Illinois
Justices of the Illinois Supreme Court
20th-century American judges